Ivan Kupala is a Russian music band from Saint Petersburg comprising Denis Fyodorov, Alexei Rumyantsev and Alexei Ivanov. The group mixes traditional Russian folk songs with electronic sounds, producing a unique blend of world music. The band named after traditional Slavic holiday.

Their debut album Kostroma (named after East Slavic fertility goddess) was highly praised by critics. 
In 1999 and 2000, "Ivan Kupala" won "Ovation" awards as "Folk group of the Year". The title track "Zdorovo, Kostroma" was used in 2014 Winter Olympics opening ceremony.

The band has made a cultural impact reinventing an authentic Russian folklore. Some Russian critics noted that the success of "Buranovskiye Babushki" on Eurovision-2012 was anticipated by "Ivan Kupala".

The group was disbanded in 2017.

Discography

Albums
 1999 – Кострома / Kostroma
 2002 – Радио Награ / Radio Nagra
 2012 – Родина / Rodina

Singles 
 2008 – Родина / Rodina
 2011 – Старый / Staryi

Compilations 
 2000 – Здорово, Кострома / Zdorovo, Kostroma (remixes)
 2003 – Лучшие песни 96-03 / Best Songs 96-03

Videos 
 Кострома / Kostroma
 Молодость / Molodost'
 Ящер / Yashcher
 Пчёлы-2 / Pchyoly-2
 Live in Korsakov, Sakhalin, Russia. 2004, DVD5, 28 minutes

Awards
   Golden Gramophone (2000)

References

External links 
Official site
Additional information from Earth-Rhythms

Musical groups from Saint Petersburg
Russian electronic music groups
New-age music groups
Russian world music groups
Musical groups established in 1996